Each "article" in this category is a collection of entries about several stamp issuers, presented in alphabetical order. The entries are formulated on the micro model and so provide summary information about all known issuers.

See the :Category:Compendium of postage stamp issuers page for details of the project.

EAF 

Refer 	East Africa Forces

East Africa 

Refer 	British East Africa

East Africa & Uganda Protectorates 

Dates 	1903–1922
Capital 	Nairobi
Currency  	(1903) 12 pies = 1 anna; 16 annas = 1 rupee
		(1907) 100 cents = 1 rupee

Refer 	British East Africa

East Africa Forces 

Dates 	1943–1948
Currency  	12 pence = 1 shilling; 20 shillings = 1 pound

Refer 	British Occupation Issues

East China (People's Post) 

Dates 	1949–1950
Currency 	100 cents = 1 dollar

Refer 	CPR Regional Issues

East Germany (DDR) 

Dates 	1949–1990
Capital 	East Berlin
Currency 	100 pfennige = 1 Ostmark

Main Article 

See also 	Germany

East India 

Dates 	1855–1882
Currency 	12 pies = 1 anna; 16 annas = 1 rupee

Main Article 

See also 	India

East India Company 

Refer 	East India

East Silesia 

Dates 	1920 only
Currency 	Czech and Polish concurrently

Refer 	Plebiscite Issues

Eastern Arabia 

Refer 	British Postal Agencies in Eastern Arabia

Eastern Command Area 

Dates 	1916–1918
Currency 	100 pfennige = 1 Reichsmark

Refer 	German Occupation Issues (WWI)

Eastern Karelia (Finnish Occupation) 

Dates 	1941–1944
Currency 	100 penni = 1 markka

Refer 	Finnish Occupation Issues

Eastern Rumelia 

Dates 	1880–1885
Capital 	Plovdiv (Philippopolis)
Currency 	40 paras = 1 piastre

Refer 	Bulgarian Territories

Eastern Siberia 

Refer 	USSR Issues for the Far East

Eastern Thrace 

Dates 	1920–1922
Currency  	100 lepta = 1 drachma

Refer 	Thrace

See also 	Adrianople;
		Greek Occupation Issues;
		Western Thrace

Ecuador 

Dates 	1865 –
Capital 	Quito
Currency 	(1865) 8 reales = 1 peso
		(1881) 100 centavos = 1 sucre

Main Article  Postage stamps and postal history of Ecuador

See also 	Galapagos Islands

Edirne 

Refer 	Adrianople

EEF 

Refer 	Palestine (Egyptian Occupation)

Eesti 

Refer 	Estonia

Egeo 

Refer 	Aegean Islands (Dodecanese)

Egypt 

Dates 	1866 –
Capital 	Cairo
Currency  	(1866) 40 paras = 1 piastre
		(1888) 1000 milliemes = 100 piastres = 1 pound

Main Article  Postage stamps and postal history of Egypt

Includes 	Egyptian Post Offices in the Turkish Empire;
		United Arab Republic (UAR)

Egypt (British Forces) 

Dates 	1932–1943
Currency  	100 piastres = 1 pound

Main Article 

See also 	BA/BMA Issues;
		British Occupation Issues;
		Middle East Forces (MEF)

Egypt (French Post Offices) 
Dates
1899–1931
Currency
(1899) 100 centimes = 1 franc
(1921) 1000 milliemes = 100 piastres = 1 pound
Main Article
French post offices in Egypt
Includes
Alexandria (French Post Office);
Port Said (French Post Office)

Egyptian Occupation Issues 

Main Article 

Includes 	Gaza;
		Palestine

Egyptian Post Offices in the Turkish Empire 

Refer 	Egypt

Éire 

Refer 	Republic of Ireland

Ellas (ELLAS) 

Refer 	Greece

Ellice Islands 

Refer 	Gilbert & Ellice Islands;
		Tuvalu

Elobey, Annobón, and Corisco 

Dates 	1903–1908
Capital 	
Currency 	100 centimos = 1 peseta

Refer 	Spanish Guinea

El Salvador 

Dates 	1867 –
Capital 	San Salvador
Currency 	(1867) 8 reales = 100 centavos = 1 peso
		(1912) 100 centavos = 1 colon

Main Article  Postage stamps and postal history of El Salvador

Elsass 

Refer 	Alsace (German Occupation)

England 

Refer 	Great Britain

Epirus 

Dates 	1914–1916
Capital 	Ioannina
Currency  	100 lepta = 1 drachma

Includes 	Northern Epirus

See also 	Greek Occupation Issues

Equatorial Guinea 

Dates 	1968 –
Capital 	Malabo (formerly Santa Isabel)
Currency 	(1968) 100 centimos = 1 pesete
		(1973) 100 centimos = 1 ekuele
		(1981) biptwele

Main Article  Postage stamps and postal history of Equatorial Guinea

Eritrea 

Dates 	1893–1942; 1993 –
Capital 	Asmara
Currency  	100 centesimi = 1 lira

Main Article  Postage stamps and postal history of Eritrea

See also 	Ethiopia;
		Italian East Africa

Eritrea (British Administration) 

Dates 	1950–1952
Currency  	100 cents = 1 shilling

Refer 	BA/BMA Issues

Eritrea (British Military Administration) 

Dates 	1948–1950
Currency  	100 cents = 1 shilling

Refer 	BA/BMA Issues

Eritrea (British Occupation) 

Refer 	Eritrea (British Administration);
		Eritrea (British Military Administration)

Est Africain Allemand Occupation Belge 

Refer 	German East Africa (Belgian Occupation)

Estado da India 

Refer 	Portuguese India

Estero 

Refer 	Italian Post Offices Abroad

Estonia 

Dates 	1918 - 1940, 1991 –
Capital 	Tallinn
Currency 	(1991) 100 kopecks = 1 Russian ruble
		(1992) 100 senti = 1 kroon

Main Article  Postage stamps and postal history of Estonia

Includes 	Estonia (pre–Soviet)

See also 	Union of Soviet Socialist Republics (USSR)

Estonia (German Occupation) 

Dates 	1941 only
Currency 	100 senti = 1 kroon

Refer 	German Occupation Issues (WWII)

Estonia (pre-Soviet) 

Dates 	1918–1940
Capital 	Tallinn
Currency 	(1918) 100 kopecks = 1 Russian ruble
		(1919) 100 penni = 1 mark
		(1928) 100 senti = 1 kroon

Refer 	Estonia

Ethiopia (Abyssinia) 

Dates 	1894 –
Capital 	Addis Ababa
Currency  	(1894) 16 guerche = 1 thaler
		(1905) 100 centimes = 1 franc
		(1907) 16 guerche = 1 thaler
		(1908) 16 piastres = 1 thaler
		(1928) 16 mehaleks = 1 thaler
		(1936) 100 centimes = 1 thaler
		(1936) 100 centesimi = 1 lira
		(1946) 100 cents = 1 dollar
		(1976) 100 cents = 1 birr

Main Article
Postage stamps and postal history of Ethiopia

See also 	Eritrea;
		Ethiopia (Italian Occupation);
		Italian East Africa

Ethiopia (French Post Offices) 

Dates 	1906–1908
Currency  	100 centimes = 1 franc

Refer 	French Post Offices Abroad

Ethiopia (Italian Occupation) 

Dates 	1936 only
Currency  	100 centesimi = 1 lira

Refer 	Italian Occupation Issues

See also 	Ethiopia;
		Italian East Africa

Eupen & Malmedy (Belgian Occupation) 

Dates 	1920 only
Currency 	(1920: initial issue) 100 pfennige = 1 Reichsmark
		(1920: later issues) 100 centimes = 1 franc

Refer 	Belgian Occupation Issues

References

Bibliography
 Stanley Gibbons Ltd, Europe and Colonies 1970, Stanley Gibbons Ltd, 1969
 Stanley Gibbons Ltd, various catalogues
 Stuart Rossiter & John Flower, The Stamp Atlas, W H Smith, 1989
 XLCR Stamp Finder and Collector's Dictionary, Thomas Cliffe Ltd, c.1960

External links
 AskPhil – Glossary of Stamp Collecting Terms
 Encyclopaedia of Postal History

Ea